This page provides a list of light novels which have sold over 10 million copies.

A  is a style of Japanese young adult fiction primarily targeting high school and middle school students. The term "light novel" is a wasei-eigo, or a Japanese term formed from words in the English language. or, in English, LN. The average length of a light novel is about 50,000 words.

References 

Lists of light novels
Light novels
Light novels-related lists
Lists of bestsellers